Cheemeni-II is a village in vellarikund taluk of Kasaragod district in Kerala, India.

Demographics
As of 2011 Indian census, Cheemeni-II had population of 1,324 among which 637 are males and 687 are females. Cheemeni-II village has an area of 3.49 km2 with 387 families residing in it. The sex ratio of Cheemeni-II was 1,078 lower than state average of 1,084. In Cheemeni-II, population of children under 6 years was 8%. Cheemeni-II had overall literacy of 87.6%.

References

Villages in Kasaragod district